A.K.M. Mostafizur Rahman (born 3 January 1961) is a Jatiya Party politician and a former Jatiya Sangsad member representing the Kurigram-1 constituency.

Early life
Rahman was born on 3 January 1961. He has an H.S.C. degree.

Career
Rahman was elected to parliament as a Jatiya Party candidate in 1996, 2001, 2008, and 2014 from Kurigram-1.

References

Living people
1961 births
Jatiya Party politicians
7th Jatiya Sangsad members
8th Jatiya Sangsad members
9th Jatiya Sangsad members
10th Jatiya Sangsad members